Barcikowo refers to the following places in Poland:

 Barcikowo, Masovian Voivodeship
 Barcikowo, Warmian-Masurian Voivodeship